Brunswick is an unincorporated community in Lewis Township, Clay County, Indiana. It is part of the Terre Haute Metropolitan Statistical Area.

History
Brunswick was founded in about 1831. It was probably named by a settler after his native city of New Brunswick, New Jersey.

Geography

References

Unincorporated communities in Clay County, Indiana
Unincorporated communities in Indiana
Terre Haute metropolitan area